A double junction is a railway junction where a double-track railway splits into two double track lines. Usually, one line is the main line and carries traffic through the junction at normal speed, while the other track is a branch line that carries traffic through the junction at reduced speed.

A number of configurations are possible.

At grade

Diamond 

 

The simplest and oldest arrangement consists of two turnouts (points) and a fixed Diamond crossing. Because the diamond needs to be relatively coarse, say 1 in 8, the curve radius is necessarily small, leading to a speed of perhaps . This type of junction is common on street-running tramways, where speeds are quite low and junction must fit into the available road space. Because the points are close together, the entire junction can be controlled by the mechanical point rodding of a single signal box.

Signal passed at danger (SPAD) protection — A train from R to P with 12 points reverse is protected from a train from P doing a SPAD by 11 points also lying reverse. A train from P to Q is NOT protected from a train from R doing a SPAD.

Switched diamond 

The fixed diamond can be replaced with a switched diamond, which eliminates the gap in rails at the K-crossing, which allows a higher speed if the geometry is poor. However, switched diamonds are not a perfect solution to the K-crossing problem, as the switches are very coarse compared to the finer switches of a turnout, and require high maintenance. The additional ends are also awkward to control unless power operated point machines are used.

Ladder 

An improved junction replaces the diamond with turnouts, which can be of as fine an angle as possible, so that this junction can carry branch traffic at high speed. This configuration assumes power operation of the points, as high speed turnouts are generally not suitable for mechanical operation. The high speed turnouts may require more than one point machine each. The turnouts can have no superelevation while the curve in the branch can; therefore the radius in the turnouts must be greater than the radius of the curve in the branch.

Since the ladder type junction requires much more length, diamond type junctions can only be converted into ladder types if there is room and no bridges, tunnels, or platforms in the way.

SPAD protection
Essentially the same as for a double junction with diamond.

Examples include Harris Park railway station, Sydney.

Single lead left hand 

A single lead junction is used where traffic density is lower, and moves one of the turnouts on the main line onto the branch. This 
reduces the number of turnouts on the main line that are subject to wear. 

Space permitting, a single lead junction may be a stage towards construction of a higher speed ladder junction.  This is shown as blue dashed line on the diagram.

Risk 
However, unlike in the ladder, branch trains in opposite directions can collide head-on at 32 if either one passes a signal at danger (SPAD). This has contributed to fatal accidents, e.g. in the UK at: Glasgow Bellgrove on 6 March 1989 and Newton on 21 July 1991. These risks can be reduced by trap points, ATP or TPWS.

Wear and Tear 
The diamond crossing is a high wearing and undesirable component:
 gaps in the K-crossings, and V-crossing.
 vibration at gaps caused by wheels jumping over these gaps.
 small parts which allow the joins to bend.
 insulated block joints, if needed for Track circuits, create more joints to bend.
 inconvenience when trying to tamp the track.
 inconvenience of speed limits to reduce vibration.
 difficulty of obtaining "track possession" to allow maintenance to be carried out.
 often the existing tracks do not have space to allow the alternative to be built as an afterthought.
 when starting on a "green field" site, the opportunity to install two high-speed turnouts to replace each diamond should not be missed.
 the insulated block joint problem can be reduced if axle counters can replace the track circuits over the crossings.
 switched diamonds are only suitable for limited range of crossing angles, and they have their own problems.
 say 1:5 (too coarse) to 1:10 (too coarse).
 the tracks through diamonds needed to be co-planar, and if not poor geometry and poor speeds may result.
 the legs of the diamond should be straight if possible.
 Trains (magazine) devoted an issue to diamonds, which, in their opinion, are NOT a railroad's best friend
 where traffic over a diamond crossing is heavier in one direction than the other, special measures can be taken to improve performance in the heavier traffic direction.  See Trains.

Single lead Right Hand 

A right hand single lead junction cannot protect against a collision should the Q-P train overrun the signal protecting the junction, and this is not ameliorated by reverting to a double junction.

Diamond and wide centres 

A double junction with a diamond can have its speed limit raised if the track centres are widened from say 4 m to say 12 m to allow for a fixed coarse-angled diamond crossing (say 1 in 8.25) with fine-angled turnouts (1 in 15).

If the legs of the coarse crossing X are straight and flat, then this arrangement eliminates the need for switched diamonds and their inconvenient moving parts.

SPAD protection
Essentially the same as for a double junction with diamond.

Scissors crossovers

Fast Speed 
The Channel Tunnel has at its entrances a scissors crossover implemented with two turnouts replacing the usual diamond crossing in the middle.  This is only possible because of the wide track centres caused by the wide spacing of the entrances to the tunnel.  The result is high speeds on the turnout routes through those turnouts and minimum wear and tear.

All the turnouts, P, Q, R, S, X1 and X2 are all the same high speed.  Track centres need to be at least twice the normal track centres as if there was a hidden track in between.

All the turnouts are identical except for handedness.

Medium Speed 

Were this junction be made with a Diamond crossing in the middle, speeds through the turnout would be much reduced, and wear and tear on the diamond would be high.

Very slow Speed 

At Hornsby the site is very constrained and speeds through the diamond crossing was only 8km/h, increased to 15km/h after a few changes.  The site does not permit any further increase, and the restrictions dating from 1890 remain. Track centres are 12' (3.66m) throughout.

Colour coding is as follows:
 Black - unchanged
 Red - scissors crossovers
 Blue - roads and road overbridges
 Purple - other rail tracks.

Speed limits 
 on the straight through the scissors crossovers are 40km/h.
 on the curves through the diamond crossing "X" are now 15km/h.
 on the curves from S - P2 and P1 to P are 40km/h.

Grade separated

Flyovers 

A double junction can be grade separated so that there is no flat crossing, reducing conflicts and reducing congestion. Flyovers require a lot of space both lengthwise and crosswise, and cannot always be built. Flying junction example at Aynho Junction. Diving junctions such as at Chatswood are a variant.  Weaver Junction is the oldest flying junction in the United Kingdom and perhaps the world.  See also Aynho Junction.

SPAD protection
Because the diamond crossing or equivalent is eliminated, one of the potential SPAD hazards is also eliminated, leaving just the merging junction hazard.

See also 
 Grand union
 Harmelen in Holland in 1962 when an express from Utrecht collided with an Amsterdam EMU.
 Junction (rail)
 Level junction

References 
Notes

Sources
 

Rail junction types